The USRA 0-8-0 was a USRA standard class of steam locomotive designed under the control of the United States Railroad Administration, the nationalized railroad system in the United States during World War I. This was the standard heavy switcher of the USRA types, and was of 0-8-0 wheel arrangement in the Whyte notation, or "D" in UIC classification.

A total of 175 locomotives were built under USRA control; these were sent to the following railroads:

After the dissolution of the USRA, an additional 1,200 copies of the USRA 0-8-0 were built for many railroads, However, there is a known survivor of this Type, Republic Steel Corp. #285 is an ALCO (Richmond) Product built in 1925, is at the Kentucky Railway Museum, New Haven, KY. It is unknown if any more USRA 0-8-0's of this type exist.

References 

 
 
 

ALCO locomotives
Baldwin locomotives
Lima locomotives
0-8-0 locomotives
USRA locomotives
Standard gauge locomotives of the United States

Shunting locomotives 
Railway locomotives introduced in 1918